Metal can may refer to:
Tin can
Aluminum can
Beverage can